Dr. Tiffany Adaeze Porter ( Ofili; born 13 November 1987) is a track and field athlete with joint British and American nationality who specialises in the 100 metres hurdles. She represented the United States as a junior, but began representing Great Britain in 2010 on joining the senior ranks after moving to England and competed for Great Britain at the 2012 Olympic Games in London.

Porter won a bronze medal in the 100 m hurdles at the 2013 World Championships. In 2014, she won a silver medal representing England at the Commonwealth Games. Later in 2014 she took her first major title, a gold medal at the European Championships, becoming the first British woman to win a European title in the event. Her personal best of 12.51 is the current British record. She is also a two-time medallist over 60 m hurdles at the World Indoor Championships.

She is the sister of Cindy Ofili, another elite-level sprint hurdler with dual British and American nationality; Ofili, too, chose to represent Great Britain internationally. Unlike Porter, Ofili had never represented the United States as a junior. Both sisters made the final of the 100 metre hurdles at the 2016 Summer Olympics.

Early life
Tiffany Porter's father Felix is Nigerian, her mother Lalana is British of African descent. Porter was born in the United States. She has held both American and British nationality since her birth. She has therefore been eligible to represent both the United States and Great Britain. She describes herself as "proud to be American, British and Nigerian".

NCAA
Tiffany (Ofili) Porter (2006-09) is a five-time NCAA national champion and All-America selection during Hall of Fame University of Michigan Wolverines women's track and field career. Ofili won three straight national crowns (2007-09) in the 100-meter hurdles.

Athletics career
As an American athlete, Porter represented the United States at the inaugural NACAC Championships winning a silver medal. However, at the end of the 2010 season, she changed her allegiance to Great Britain. Commenting on her switch, she said: "I knew I was going to perform no matter what vest I had on. I have always regarded myself as British, American and Nigerian. I'm all three."

On 29 May 2011, at the Fanny Blankers-Koen Games, Porter broke Angie Thorp's 15-year-old British record of 12.80s in the 100m Hurdles with a run of 12.77s. Thorp said that she was "devastated" at losing her record to an American-born athlete. Thorp said that she would have congratulated an established British athlete who took her record; at the time Jessica Ennis and Sarah Claxton both had personal bests of 12.81s.

Porter lowered her British record on 22 July 2011, with a time of 12.60s at the Diamond League meeting in Monaco, breaking her previous personal best of 12.73s (set when she was still a US athlete). Her record was broken on 3 August 2012 by Jessica Ennis in the London Olympics heptathlon achieving 12.54s. In September 2011 she was nominated for "European Athlete of the Year". In October 800m runner Mariya Savinova was announced as the winner.

UK Athletics head coach, Charles van Commenee gave Porter the responsibility of the team captaincy ahead of the 2012 World Indoor Championships in March; she was subsequently labelled a "Plastic Brit" after refusing (or being unable) to recite the words of the British national anthem in a press conference.

In 2012 Porter was nominated for "European Athlete of the Month" twice. In March she was nominated along with fellow Brits Katarina Johnson-Thompson and Yamile Aldama. She was nominated again in May, this time with Hannah England and eventual winner Jessica Ennis.

In 2013 Porter switched coaches from James Henry to Rana Reider, and moved to Loughborough to train with Reider's group at Loughborough University's High Performance Centre. At the 2013 World Championships in Moscow, she won a bronze medal in the 100 m Hurdles in a personal best time of 12.55 seconds, just one hundredth of a second off Jessica Ennis' British record of 12.54.

Porter began 2014 by winning a bronze medal in the 60 m hurdles at the World Indoor Championships. Then in August, she ran 12.80 to win a silver medal in the 100 m hurdles at the Commonwealth Games in Glasgow, behind Sally Pearson of Australia. Two weeks later, she won the European Championships in Zurich, with a time of 12.76. In September, at the IAAF Continental Cup, she broke the UK record with a time of 12.51 secs, finishing behind Dawn Harper-Nelson of the US.

Personal life
Porter is the older sister of the hurdler Cindy Ofili, who also competes for Great Britain.

Porter married American hurdler Jeff Porter in May 2011, and began to compete under her married name in July 2011, initially as Tiffany Ofili-Porter, then simply as Tiffany Porter. She graduated from the University of Michigan with a PhD in pharmacology in 2012.

International competitions

References

External links

1987 births
Living people
Track and field athletes from Michigan
American female hurdlers
British female hurdlers
Olympic female hurdlers
Olympic athletes of Great Britain
Athletes (track and field) at the 2012 Summer Olympics
Athletes (track and field) at the 2016 Summer Olympics
Athletes (track and field) at the 2020 Summer Olympics
Commonwealth Games silver medallists for England
Commonwealth Games medallists in athletics
Athletes (track and field) at the 2014 Commonwealth Games
Athletes (track and field) at the 2018 Commonwealth Games
World Athletics Championships athletes for Great Britain
World Athletics Championships medalists
European Athletics Championships winners
European Athletics Championships medalists
British Athletics Championships winners
Michigan Wolverines women's track and field athletes
American people of British descent
American sportspeople of Nigerian descent
Medallists at the 2014 Commonwealth Games